Hypotacha is a genus of moths in the family Erebidae.

Species
isthmigera species group
Hypotacha fiorii Berio, 1943
Hypotacha fractura Kühne, 2005
Hypotacha indecisa Walker, 1857 (syn: Hypotacha sabulosa Swinhoe, 1884)
Hypotacha isthmigera Wiltshire, 1968
Hypotacha raffaldi Berio, 1939 
retracta species group
Hypotacha alba Kühne, 2005
Hypotacha austera Kühne, 2004
Hypotacha brandbergensis Kühne, 2004
Hypotacha bubo Berio, 1941
Hypotacha catilla Kühne, 2004
Hypotacha glaucata (Holland, 1897)
Hypotacha legrandi (Berio, 1959)
Hypotacha ochribasalis (Hampson, 1896)
Hypotacha retracta (Hampson, 1902)
Hypotacha soudanensis Kühne, 2005
unknown species group
Hypotacha antrummagna Kühne, 2005
Hypotacha nigristria Hampson, 1902
Hypotacha parva Kühne, 2004
Hypotacha pulla Kühne, 2004

References

 , 2005: Esperiana Buchreihe zur Entomologie Memoir 2: 1-220

External links

Natural History Museum Lepidoptera genus database

 
Audeini
Moth genera